Popov is a rural locality (a khutor) in Alexeyevsky District, Belgorod Oblast, Russia. The population was 3 as of 2010.

References 

Rural localities in Alexeyevsky District, Belgorod Oblast